In additive number theory, the Schnirelmann density of a sequence of numbers is a way to measure how "dense" the sequence is. It is named after Russian mathematician Lev Schnirelmann, who was the first to study it.

Definition
The Schnirelmann density of a set of natural numbers A is defined as

where A(n) denotes the number of elements of A not exceeding n and inf is infimum.

The Schnirelmann density is well-defined even if the limit of A(n)/n as  fails to exist (see upper and lower asymptotic density).

Properties
Furthermore,

Sensitivity
The Schnirelmann density is sensitive to the first values of a set:
 .
In particular,

and

Consequently, the Schnirelmann densities of the even numbers and the odd numbers, which one might expect to agree, are 0 and 1/2 respectively. Schnirelmann and Yuri Linnik exploited this sensitivity as we shall see.

Schnirelmann's theorems
It is clear that . In fact, we still have , and one might ask at what point the sumset attains Schnirelmann density 1 and how does it increase. Schnirelmann further succeeded in developing these ideas into the following theorems, aiming towards Additive Number Theory, and proving them to be a novel resource (if not greatly powerful) to attack important problems, such as Waring's problem and Goldbach's conjecture.

Theorem. Then

Note that . Inductively, we have the following generalization.

Corollary. Then

The theorem provides the first insights on how sumsets accumulate. It seems unfortunate that its conclusion stops short of showing  being superadditive. Yet, Schnirelmann provided us with the following results, which sufficed for most of his purpose.

Theorem. If , then

Theorem. (Schnirelmann) Let . If  then there exists  such that

Additive bases
A subset  with the property that  for a finite sum, is called an additive basis, and the least number of summands required is called the degree (sometimes order) of the basis. Thus, the last theorem states that any set with positive Schnirelmann density is an additive basis. In this terminology, the set of squares  is an additive basis of degree 4. (About an open problem for additive bases, see Erdős–Turán conjecture on additive bases.)

Mann's theorem
Historically the theorems above were pointers to the following result, at one time known as the  hypothesis. It was used by Edmund Landau and was finally proved by Henry Mann in 1942.

Theorem. In case that , we still have

An analogue of this theorem for lower asymptotic density was obtained by Kneser. At a later date, E. Artin and P. Scherk simplified the proof of Mann's theorem.

Waring's problem

Let  and  be natural numbers. Let . Define  to be the number of non-negative integral solutions to the equation

in the variables , respectively. Thus . We have

The hard part is to show that this bound still works on the average, i.e.,

Lemma.

for all 

With this at hand, the following theorem can be elegantly proved.

Theorem.

We have thus established the general solution to Waring's Problem:

Corollary.

Schnirelmann's constant
In 1930 Schnirelmann used these ideas in conjunction with the Brun sieve to prove Schnirelmann's theorem, that any natural number greater than 1 can be written as the sum of not more than C prime numbers, where C is an effectively computable constant: Schnirelmann obtained C < 800000.  Schnirelmann's constant is the lowest number C with this property.

Olivier Ramaré showed in  that Schnirelmann's constant is at most 7, improving the earlier upper bound of 19 obtained by Hans Riesel and R. C. Vaughan.

Schnirelmann's constant is at least 3; Goldbach's conjecture implies that this is the constant's actual value.

In 2013, Harald Helfgott proved Goldbach's weak conjecture for all odd numbers. Therefore Schnirelmann's constant is at most 4.

Essential components
Khintchin proved that the sequence of squares, though of zero Schnirelmann density, when added to a sequence of Schnirelmann density between 0 and 1, increases the density:

 

This was soon simplified and extended by Erdős, who showed, that if A is any sequence with Schnirelmann density α and B is an additive basis of order k then

 

and this was improved by Plünnecke to

Sequences with this property, of increasing density less than one by addition, were named essential components by Khintchin.  Linnik showed that an essential component need not be an additive basis  as he constructed an essential component that has xo(1) elements less than x.  More precisely, the sequence has

 

elements less than x for some c < 1. This was improved by E. Wirsing to

 

For a while, it remained an open problem how many elements an essential component must have. Finally, Ruzsa determined that an essential component has at least (log x)c elements up to x, for some c > 1, and for every c > 1 there is an essential component which has at most (log x)c elements up to x.

References

 
 
 
 
 

 
 
 
 
 Has a proof of Mann's theorem and the Schnirelmann-density proof of Waring's conjecture.
 
 
 

Additive number theory
Mathematical constants